Bart Veldkamp (born 22 November 1967) is a retired speed skater, who represented the Netherlands and later Belgium in international competitions, including the Winter Olympics. He currently is the national speed skating coach of Belgium.

Speed skating 
In 1990, Bart Veldkamp won the European Allround Championships and came very close to repeating that feat 11 years later in 2001, finishing 2nd. At the 1992 Winter Olympics, he won a gold medal on the 10,000 m. Mainly due to this achievement, Veldkamp was named Dutch Sportsman of the Year in 1992. Before the 1994 Winter Olympics, he was dissatisfied with the qualifying procedures for tournaments and became a Belgian. In Belgium there was (and still is) no speed skating tradition, so qualifying for tournaments became simple because there were no other speed skaters to compete with.

In Lillehammer at the 1994 Winter Olympics, Veldkamp won a bronze medal on the 10,000 m for the Netherlands. The next Olympic medal he won was as a Belgian at the 1998 Winter Olympics on the 5,000 m, in which he became the first skater ever to break the 6:30 barrier on that distance, but his time was beaten later that same day by former compatriots Rintje Ritsma and Gianni Romme. His bronze medal was the first ever Olympic medal in speed skating for Belgium.

In 1997, Veldkamp participated in the Elfstedentocht. In 2003, he announced that the 2006 Winter Olympics at Turin would be his third Winter Olympics as a Belgian, his fifth overall, and definitely his last. At these 2006 Winter Olympics, Veldkamp finished 13th on the 5,000 m and 14th on the 10,000 m and ended his career afterwards.

Commentary and coaching 
After his career Veldkamp became a sports commentator for the NOS to analyze speed skating races. He also appeared on several other TV shows such as Peking Express and Wildebeesten.

In the 2006/2007 winter season Veldkamp trained four Kenyan athletes, for the first time ever on ice, for a Dutch TV show. The goal was to let them skate the 200 km long alternative Elfstedentocht at the Weissensee in Austria.

He currently is the national speed skating coach of Belgium.

Records

Personal records

Source: SpeedskatingResults.com

By 12 January 2014, Veldkamp was placed 107th with a score of 152.621 points on the Adelskalender, the ranking list for all-time personal bests. His highest ranking ever on the Adelskalender was a 5th place.

World records
Veldkamp skated one world record:

Source: SpeedSkatingStats.com

Tournament overview

Source: 
NC = No classification
DNQ = Did not qualify

Medals won

Medals
An overview of medals won by Veldkamp at important championships, listing the years in which he won each medal:

References

DESG
Bart Veldkamp at SpeedSkatingStats.com
Personal records from The Skatebase
2005/2006 season best performances
Bart Veldkamp at Speed Skating Hall of Fame

External links 

 Bart Veldkamp, official website

1967 births
Living people
Dutch male speed skaters
Belgian male speed skaters
Dutch speed skating coaches
Olympic speed skaters of the Netherlands
Olympic speed skaters of Belgium
Olympic medalists in speed skating
Olympic gold medalists for the Netherlands
Olympic bronze medalists for the Netherlands
Olympic bronze medalists for Belgium
Speed skaters at the 1992 Winter Olympics
Speed skaters at the 1994 Winter Olympics
Speed skaters at the 1998 Winter Olympics
Speed skaters at the 2002 Winter Olympics
Speed skaters at the 2006 Winter Olympics
Medalists at the 1992 Winter Olympics
Medalists at the 1994 Winter Olympics
Medalists at the 1998 Winter Olympics
World Allround Speed Skating Championships medalists
World Single Distances Speed Skating Championships medalists
World record setters in speed skating
Sportspeople from The Hague